Gasim bey Zakir (also spelled Kāṣīm Bey Ḏh̲ākir) (died 1857) was an Azerbaijani poet of the 19th century and one of the founders of the critical realism and satirical genre in Azerbaijani literature. He is considered to be the foremost Azerbaijani poet and satirist of the first half of the 19th century, and the greatest master of 19th-century comic poetry in Azerbaijani.

He is the grandfather of Abdulla bey Asi and Ibrahim Bey Azer.

Life
Zakir was probably born in 1786 in a noble family of beys ("lords, chiefs") in Panahabad, then the capital of the Karabakh Khanate. Zakir belonged to the clan of Javanshir, which was the ruling clan in the Karabakh Khanate.

Through his satirical poetry, Zakir vigorously rebuked the religious fanaticism of the religious clergy (mullahs) as well as the corruption and misrule by the local aristocracy (beyzadehs) and the Tsarist officials. Due to his criticism of the latter, the Russian governor of Karabakh, Prince Konstantin Tarkhanov, deported Zakir to Baku for some time. Eventually, due to intervention by his friends, he was allowed to return to his family grounds, where he would spend most of his life.

Some of Zakir's complaints and pleas for help (shekayat-nameh), which he wrote in verse, have been preserved and published. These works, written in masterful verse, were addressed to influential fellow countrymen such as Mirza Fatali Akhundov and the first Azerbaijani novelist Ismayil bek Kutkashensky, who had achieved a high rank in the Imperial Russian Army. Zakir's writing style was influenced by Molla Panah Vagif (1717-97). Zakir, like Vagif, preferred the simple popular lyric forms used in the ashik folk literature. Zakir also wrote some poems in Persian and in traditional metric forms, as well as some pieces in rhymed prose. Zakir's fables in verse, were written in the then common oriental tradition first attested in Kalīla wa-Dimna, however, they may also be influenced by Ivan Krylov's (1768-1844) adaptations. In Zakir's works a number of Russian words from the terminology of administration made their first appearance in Azerbaijani.

Zakir's poetry was first published in 1854 in the Tiflis-based newspaper Kavkaz and in 1856 in Temir-Khan-Shura (now Buynaksk) by Mirza Yusuf Nersesov Karabaghi.

Creativity
Gasim bey was the prominent representative of critical realism of Azerbaijani literature in the first half of the 19th century. Gasim bey's poetry is characterized by diversity of genres. In lyric poetry the poet follows Molla Panah Vagif's traditions, writes gazals, goshmas, gerayli, in which he glorifies love.
Zakir, the author of lyrics and beautiful patterns of love poetry, was famed for his satirical works. Zakir sharply criticized tsar's officers and arbitrariness of local beys (landlords) and clergies.
Today Zakir's literary legacy has been preserved in verses ranging from sharply critical satire to the tender lyrics praising pure and passionate love.

Notes

References

Notes 

Azerbaijani-language poets
Azerbaijani nobility
1786 births
1857 deaths
Writers from Shusha
People of the Russo-Persian Wars
Persian-language poets
Burials at Mirza Hassan Cemetery